Zima Clearmalt was a clear, lightly carbonated alcoholic beverage made and distributed by the Coors Brewing Company. Introduced in 1993, it was marketed as an alternative to beer, an example of what is now often referred to as a cooler, with 4.7–5.4% alcohol by volume. Its production in the United States ceased in October 2008, but it was still marketed in Japan until 2021. On June 2, 2017, MillerCoors announced a limited release of Zima for the U.S. market. It was sold again in the U.S. in the summers of 2017 and 2018, but did not return in 2019.

History

Zima means "winter" in many Slavic languages. It was launched nationally in the United States as Zima Clearmalt in 1993 after being test-marketed two years earlier in the cities of Nashville, Sacramento, and Syracuse. The lemon-lime drink was part of the "clear craze" of the 1990s that produced products such as Crystal Pepsi and Tab Clear. Early advertisements for Zima described it as a "truly unique alcohol beverage" and used the tagline "Zomething different".

Zima offered an alternative to the then-successful wine cooler category. Coors spent $50 million marketing Zima in its first year, persuading nearly half of American alcohol drinkers to try it. Brandweek magazine reported that at Zima's peak in 1994, 1.2 million barrels of the beverage were sold. It was originally popular among young women. Coors made its first attempt at attracting young men to the brand in 1995 by marketing Zima Gold (an amber-colored beverage that promised a "taste of bourbon").  The drink was unpopular and disappeared from store shelves within the year.

In describing The Long, Slow, Torturous Death of Zima, writer Brendan Koerner cited Zima's perceived reputation as a "girly-man" beverage and its persistent parodying by late-night TV host David Letterman. The Chicago Tribune reported that distributors were asked to stock "caffeinated alcoholic beverage Sparks on retail store shelves to make up for Zima’s absence".

In the late 2000s, the beverage was marketed in additional flavors: citrus, tangerine, and pineapple citrus.

On October 20, 2008, MillerCoors LLC announced that it had discontinued production of Zima in the U.S., choosing instead to focus on other "malternative" beverages. 

In February 2017, MillerCoors announced that they were in negotiations to bring Zima back to the U.S. market. On June 2, 2017, it was announced that Zima would have a limited release beginning on July 4 weekend. Demand for the product exceeded the company's expectations, selling out entirely by September. As a result, in May 2018 MillerCoors announced it would once again bring back Zima for a limited time, with 40 percent more inventory available than in 2017.

It was discontinued in Japan in December 2021.

See also

 List of defunct consumer brands

References

External links
 Zima brand profile on Brandchannel

Products and services discontinued in 2008
Zima
Defunct drink brands
Zima
Products introduced in 1993